Haren may refer to:

Places 
 Haren, Brussels, Belgium
 Haren Prison on the outskirts of Brussels, Belgium
 Haren, Germany (Lower Saxony)
 Haren, Groningen, Netherlands
 Hortus Haren, a botanical garden in Groningen
 Project X Haren, a 2012 event that started out as a public invitation through Facebook to a birthday party in Groningen, but ended up as a riot by thousands of youths
 Haren, North Brabant, Netherlands

People with the surname 
 Dan Haren, baseball pitcher
 Piotr Haren (born  1970), Danish footballer

See also 
 Haaren (disambiguation)
 Haren railway station (disambiguation)
 Horan